Iambia volasira is a moth of the  family Noctuidae.

Distribution
It is found in south-western Madagascar (near Tulear).

References
Viette, 1968e. Révision des Noctuelles trifides de Madagascar (Lep.) (Premier supplément). - Annales de la Société Entomologique de France (N.S.) 4(3):555–572.

Moths of Madagascar
Amphipyrinae
Moths of Africa